The 1949 Sam Houston State Bearkats football team represented Sam Houston State Teachers College (now known as Sam Houston State University) as a member of the Lone Star Conference (LSC)  during the 1949 college football season. Led by ninth-year head coach Puny Wilson, the Bearkats compiled an overall record of 3–7 with a mark of 0–3 in conference play, and finished fourth in the LSC.

Schedule

References

Sam Houston State
Sam Houston Bearkats football seasons
Sam Houston State Bearkats football